Jean-Bernard Émond is a Canadian politician, who was elected to the National Assembly of Quebec in the 2018 provincial election. He represents the electoral district of Richelieu as a member of the Coalition Avenir Québec. Emond is a businessman who co-managed a family printing company in Sorel-Tracy. He is a founding member of the Coalition Avenir Québec.

His brother Pierre-André Émond was named the Conservative Party of Canada candidate for the upcoming federal election in the riding of Bécancour—Nicolet—Saurel, which overlaps his provincial riding of Richelieu.

References

Living people
Coalition Avenir Québec MNAs
21st-century Canadian politicians
People from Montérégie
Year of birth missing (living people)